Insulin-like growth factor-binding protein 2 is a protein that in humans is encoded by the IGFBP2 gene.

References

Further reading